is a town located in Kita District, Ehime Prefecture, Japan. , the town had an estimated population of 15,554 in 7056 households and a population density of 52 persons per km².

Geography 
Uchiko is located in roughly in the center of Ehime Prefecture, approximately 40 kilometers southwest of Matsuyama City, the prefectural capital.Three streams run through the area: the Oda, the Nakayama and the Fumoto. Uchiko has few flat areas and about 70% of the land is forest.

Neighbouring municipalities 
Ehime Prefecture
 Ōzu
 Seiyo
 Iyo
 Kumakōgen
 Tobe

Climate
Uchiko has a Humid subtropical climate (Köppen Cfa) characterized by warm summers and cool winters with light snowfall.  The average annual temperature in Uchiko is 14.8 °C. The average annual rainfall is 1915 mm with September as the wettest month. The temperatures are highest on average in January, at around 25.8 °C, and lowest in January, at around 3.9 °C.

Demographics
Per Japanese census data, the population of Uchiko has been decreased steadily since the 1950s.

History 
The area of Uchiko was part of ancient Iyo Province and prospered since ancient times as an important transportation hub on the Ōzu Highway and as a transit point for the Shikoku Pilgrimage. During the Edo period, the area was part of the holdings of Ōzu Domain or its semi-subsidiary, Niiya Domain. The town of Uchikoi was established with the creation of the modern municipalities system on December 1, 1889. From the Edo period to the Meiji period, it prospered in the production of Japanese paper and Japanese wax. In particular, Japanese wax became famous overseas for its high quality, accounting for about 30% of the national production at its peak. At that time the Yokaichi and Gokoku districts became industrialised and their historical houses still retain some vestige of Uchiko’s former glory. In the Yokaichi and Gokoku districts is a street of merchant houses, which have solemn white or cream coloured plaster walls, lattices, decorative walls and old-style Japanese desks. This traditional street is about 600 meters long and around 90 of these historical houses are still lived in. After the Taisho period (1912-1926), Japan wax production declined due to the spread of oil and electricity.  In 1982, its historic townscape was designated as an "Important Preservation District for Groups of Traditional Buildings". On January 1, 2005, the town of Ikazaki, from Kita District; and the town of Oda, from Kamiukena District, were merged into Uchiko.

Government
Uchiko has a mayor-council form of government with a directly elected mayor and a unicameral town council of 15 members. Uchiko, together Ōzu, contributes two members to the Ehime Prefectural Assembly. In terms of national politics, the town is part of Ehime 4th district of the lower house of the Diet of Japan.

Economy
Uchiko has a typical hilly and mountainous area, and agriculture and forestry are the main industries. The soil is fertile and leaf tobacco, shiitake mushrooms, and fruits such as persimmons, grapes and nashi pears make use of the sloping land, opening the way for tourist orchards.. The riversides are used mainly by farms and farmland can extend to the hills and the steep mountainsides.

Education
Uchiko has eight public elementary schools and four public middle schools operated by the town government, and two public high schools operated by the Ehime Prefectural Board of Education.

Transportation

Railway
 Shikoku Railway Company - Yosan Line
  -  
 Shikoku Railway Company - Uchiko Line
  -

Highways 
  Matsuyama Expressway

Sister Cities
  Wasilla, Alaska , United States 
  Rothenburg ob der Tauber, Germany

Local attractions

Uchiko Theatre
The Uchiko-za was built as a traditional Kabuki theatre in 1916 and was famous for its Kabuki and Bunraku (traditional puppet show) performances. In the course of time, it became used for film shows, variety shows and lectures, amongst other things. In 1985, the theatre was restored to its original appearance. Today, Uchiko-za presents plays, concerts and other events, including the very popular Bunraku performances. The Uchiko-za is unique and traditional because of its open Taiko-drum tower, the boxed seating area, the broad ramp leading to the stage along one side of the audience and the wooden, revolving stage. The Uchiko-za is considered a showpiece of Japanese culture and architecture.

The Kamihaga Residence and Japanese Wax Museum
The Kamihaga Residence was built in 1894 by a family who were a branch of the Honhaga household (the main household in Uchiko). The Kamihaga family was one of the most influential families in Uchiko. They established the production of wax in Uchiko and thus, the family became very wealthy and powerful. Now, this elegant and traditional property, with its spacious garden, is used a museum that has exhibitions on commerce, the lifestyle of the merchants and the production of wax. These grounds are designated as an Important Cultural Property and have been since 1990.

Annual events
Late April: The Raft Festival at the River Oda, Oda.
May 5: The Kite Flying Festival in Ikazaki.
Late May – Early June:Rice planting in Ikazaki
August 6–8: The Bamboo Festival in Uchiko.
August 15: The Fire Festival in Oda.
October: The Autumn Festival, The Japanese Lion Dance.
November: Momiji – Autumn leaf viewing.
December: Solfa Ski Resort opens in Oda.

Notable people from Uchiko
 The Nobel laureate Kenzaburō Ōe was born in the former village of Ōse, which is now today a part of Uchiko.

References

External links

Uchiko Town International Association
Uchiko official website 

Towns in Ehime Prefecture
Uchiko, Ehime